Yulamanovo (Yulaman) is a rural locality (a village) in Tolbazinsky Selsoviet, Aurgazinsky District, Bashkortostan, Russia. The population was 407 as of 2010. There are 8 streets.

Geography 
Yulamanovo is located 6 km northwest of Tolbazy (the district's administrative centre) by road. Tolbazy is the nearest rural locality.

References 

Rural localities in Aurgazinsky District